Bornoporichoy (Learning alphabets) is a 2019 Indian Bengali-language neo-noir action  crime thriller film written and directed by Mainak Bhowmick. The film starring Jisshu Sengupta, Abir Chatterjee and Priyanka Sarkar was released under the banner of Shree Venkatesh Films on 26 July 2019. Anupam Roy is the music director of the film.

Plot
Dhananjoy Chatterjee is a burnt-out but bright police detective, who has been in hot pursuit of Arko Bhattacharya, a serial killer. Arko has been on a vicious killing spree, with his victims seemingly random people. There does not seem to be any connection or common factor between any two murders. The case takes a toll on Dhananjoy, and his wife, Malini leaves him, along with their son, Gogol. The murders stop and the killer suddenly disappears. With the trail turning cold and with his personal life in shambles, Dhananjoy takes to drinking. After an inexplicable and mysterious hiatus, the murders resume, forcing Dhananjoy to kick the bottle, pick up the pieces, and join the pursuit of the dangerous killer once again.

Cast
 Jisshu Sengupta as Dhananjoy Chatterjee, a police detective
 Abir Chatterjee as Arko Bhattacharya
 Priyanka Sarkar as Malini Chatterjee, wife of Dhananjoy
 Dipro Sen as Gogol, son of Dhananjoy and Malini
 Mithu Chakraborty as a mother of Malini 
 Sudip Mukherjee as Senior Inspector Karmakar
 Prantik Banerjee as Inspector Indra
 Kaushik Bhattacharya as Inspector Proshun

Release
The film was released theatrically on 26 July 2019.

Soundtrack

The soundtrack is composed by Anupam Roy on his own lyrics.

References

External links
 

2019 films
Bengali-language Indian films
2010s Bengali-language films
2019 thriller drama films
Indian films about revenge
Films scored by Anupam Roy
Films directed by Mainak Bhaumik
Indian chase films
Indian mystery thriller films
Indian neo-noir films
Indian serial killer films
Indian thriller drama films
2010s mystery thriller films
2010s serial killer films